Mojave lupine is a common name for several lupines and may refer to:

Lupinus odoratus
Lupinus sparsiflorus